These are the official results of the Women's 400 metres event at the 2001 IAAF World Championships in Edmonton, Canada.

Medalists

Results

Heats
Qualification: First 3 in each semifinal (Q) and the next 6 fastest (q) advance to the semifinals.

Semifinals
Qualification: First 2 in each semifinal (Q) and the next 2 fastest (q) advance to the final.

Final

References
 Finals Results
 Semi-finals results
 Heats results

400
400 metres at the World Athletics Championships
2001 in women's athletics